Ali Kemal Sunal (11 November 1944 – 3 July 2000) was a Turkish actor and comedian. With Hababam Sınıfı, Kapıcılar Kralı and Davaro, Sunal gained large popularity amongst Turkish cinema goers and was famed for his character "Şaban", a role he frequently played.

Career 
Kemal Sunal graduated from Vefa Lisesi (Vefa High School). In his early ages, he started pursuing what was to become a long and successful acting career in minor roles in various theatres. For a brief period, he worked in the Kenterler Theatre and debuted in the play Zoraki Tabip. He was later transferred to the Devekuşu Kabare Theatre, where he performed his acting.

He was recognized as a real talent, and started receiving offers for movies with larger budgets and a more famous cast. His first bigger role was in the film "Tatlı Dillim" directed by Ertem Eğilmez. In a matter of years, Sunal co-starred alongside Halit Akçatepe, Şener Şen and Münir Özkul.

Perhaps the most famous of all his parts was when he played in Hababam Sınıfı (The Outrageous Class) and was known by the name of "Şaban", but most of his classmates just called him İnek (cow) Şaban. İnek Şaban was constantly bullied and humiliated by his friends, but this never kept him from thinking the unthinkable, like digging a tunnel to escape school grounds (which later, turned out to lead to the vice-principal’s office) or smoking in the school attic. The character was so pure and so fixed in the memories of the Turkish people, it was never replaced by another actor in the recent re-shootings of Hababam Sınıfı, most probably as a sign of respect to Sunal.

His other notable characters include: Tosun Pasha; Süt Kardeş Şaban; Çöpçüler Kralı, who fell in love with a municipality officer’s fiancée; Doktor Civanım, a former hospital janitor pretending to be a doctor upon his return to his home village; and finally "Orta Direk Şaban", a naive man trying to become an athlete to impress his crush.

The huge popularity of his movies stemmed not only from their unique humour but also their depiction of the many problems faced by the poor rural people in Turkey during the 1970s and 1980s. In almost all of his films, Kemal Sunal plays a poor man, trying to make a living.

Sunal’s last film was Propaganda, which was directed by Sinan Çetin. Sunal, played a customs officer-in-charge (presumably) on the Syrian border. Being a serious drama, this film was a contrast to his other works. As the plot unfolded, Sunal’s character fell into despair, trying to survive the dilemma between his duties as an officer of the law and his duties as a friend. In the public opinion, this film was not the best of his works. Another significant fact about this film is that it also included Ali Sunal, Kemal Sunal’s son, cast as a junior customs officer.

Personal life 

Sunal kept himself and his family away from the media and rarely appeared in public. People who knew him have commented on how serious he was in his real life, in contrast to the funny characters he played in his movies. Whilst he was at the top of his career, he decided to finish university, which he had dropped out of in his early career. Despite his fame, he attended the university like a regular student and stated that "that was the way he liked it to be".

Sunal's dreams of higher-education were disrupted in 1980, during the period of military takeover. His attempts to earn a degree finally paid off in 1995, when he earned his bachelor’s degree in Radio Television and Cinema Studies from Marmara University. He then decided to pursue a master’s degree (the topic of this thesis being himself), which he earned in 1998, also from Marmara University. This incident was covered by the media with headlines like "İnek Şaban Master Yaptı" (Şaban the Geek got a master's degree) while his 'classmates' from Hababam Sinifi made comments like "Profesorluk Bekliyoruz" ("We expect full professorship"). At his graduation ceremony, he made a speech joking that his path of first working and then attending university later in life was better as it allowed him to gain real life experience first.

Death
Kemal Sunal died on July 3, 2000, as a result of a sudden heart attack aboard a flight to Trabzon just before take-off. He was reported to be afraid of flying. His death caused mourning that swept the entire nation and dominated news coverage for many days. He was interred at the Zincirlikuyu Cemetery in Istanbul.

Kemal Sunal and his wife Gül Sunal (born 1957) had two children, Ali Sunal (born 1977) and Ezo Sunal (born 1985).

Filmography

Films

Television

Awards 

 1977: 14. Antalya Film Şenliği (14th Antalya Film Festival), Best Actor, Kapıcılar Kralı
 1998: 35. Antalya Film Şenliği (35th Antalya Film Festival), Lifetime honorary award, Kapıcılar Kralı
 1989: 2. Ankara Film Şenliği (2nd Ankara Film Festival), Best Actor, Düttürü Dünya

Books

See also
 Şener Şen
 Nazan Saatci, from movie Tokatçı (1983)

References

Further reading 
Gül Sunal, Kemal Hadi Gel, Bi Kahve İçelim, Doğan Kitap, 
Feriha Karasu Gürses, Kemal Sunal Film Başka Yaşam Başka, Sel Yayınları, Istanbul 2002, 
Nuran Turan, Kemal Sunal Çocukken, Önel Yayınevi, 
Vadullah Taş, Kemal Sunal Filmlerini Anlatıyor, Esen Kitap

External links 

1944 births
2000 deaths
Turkish male film actors
Male actors from Istanbul
Turkish male stage actors
Turkish comedians
Best Actor Golden Orange Award winners
Vefa High School alumni
Marmara University alumni
Burials at Zincirlikuyu Cemetery
Golden Orange Life Achievement Award winners
20th-century Turkish male actors
20th-century comedians